HMS Exeter was a 60-gun fourth-rate ship of the line of the Royal Navy, launched at Portsmouth Dockyard on 26 May 1697.

She was involved in repeated actions against the French, in 1702 off Newfoundland, and in 1705 when she captured the frigate Thétis. She was in the Mediterranean in 1711, and at the Battle of Quiberon Bay.  She was rebuilt according to the 1733 proposals of the 1719 Establishment at Plymouth, and relaunched on 19 March 1744.  She was at the siege of Pondicherry in 1748.  Samuel Hood, 1st Viscount Hood briefly served aboard her.

Exeter continued to serve until 1763, when she was broken up.

Notes

References

 Lavery, Brian (2003) The Ship of the Line - Volume 1: The development of the battlefleet 1650-1850. Conway Maritime Press. .

Ships of the line of the Royal Navy
1690s ships